Íþróttafélagið Leiknir, commonly known as Leiknir Reykjavík, is an Icelandic multi-sports club. It is best known for its men's football team that plays in 1. deild karla, the second tier of Icelandic football, but also fields departments in Badminton, basketball, volleyball and karate. The club was founded in 1973 and is based in Breiðholt, Reykjavík. In 2014 the men's football team placed 1st in the 1. deild karla and won a promotion to the Úrvalsdeild, however after just one season they were relegated to back to the first division. In 2021 they will return to the top flight having finished second in the 2020 season. Their home is Leiknisvöllur, where they have played since their early years.
The club's motto is "Pride of Breiðholt".

The club runs a youth setup in its district for children aged 6–18. The club is renowned for playing many homegrown players and developing young players. Currently the majority of their players are homegrown.

Facilities
The whole Leiknir area is newly renovated and is in excellent condition. In 2008 the club opened its new facilities which replaced the old cabin that had served as the club's office and dressing facility since 1987. The current facilities are a 700 sq m club house, artificial turf with heat, main stadium and total of 4 practice grounds. One practice ground is called Þorsteins-völlur, named on 7 September 2012 in memory of 9-year-old Þorsteinn Björnsson, a former player of the youth department in Leiknir.

The club has access to a swimming pool and a gymnasium located next to the Leiknir area.

Men's football

Seasons

Support
The club's anthem is In the Ghetto made famous by Elvis Presley and is played before every home game.

Rivalry
Leiknir's main rivals are their neighbours ÍR. Leiknir and ÍR are the only football clubs in Breiðholt and they represent two different areas of the neighbourhood. Those games tend to be very interesting. The club's record against ÍR in more recent times is very favorable.

Honours

League

 1. deild karla (1st Division)
 Winners (1): 2014
 2. deild karla (2nd Division)
 Winners (1): 2005
 3. deild karla (3rd Division)
 Runner up (1): 2003

Cups

 Reykjavíkurmótið  (Reykjavik Cup)
 Winners (2): 2013 2016
 Runners up (1): 2015
 Deildarbikarkeppni KSÍ – B deild  (League Cup – B division)
 Winners (1): 2005

Players

Current squad

Managerial history

Basketball
Leiknir's basbasketball department was founded in 1992. In October 2021, Brynjar Karl Sigurðsson was announced as the new chairman of Leiknir's basketball department.

Men's basketball

Titles
 2. deild karla:
 Winners (1): 2016
 Runner up (1):' 1993, 2010

Women's basketball

History 
In March 2022, the team started a collaberation with Aþena basketball club to field a team in the women's second-tier 1. deild kvenna.

References

External links
 Official homepage
 Videos of architects impression of new facilities

Football clubs in Iceland
Football clubs in Reykjavík
Basketball teams in Iceland
Association football clubs established in 1973
Sport in Reykjavík
1973 establishments in Iceland